The Giabal, also known as the Gomaingguru, were an indigenous Australian tribe of southern Queensland.

Country
Their eastern extension ran close to Gatton, while their western frontier reached west to Millmerran. According to Stephen Wurm and Suzanne Kite, the Giabal were the southernmost branch of the Baruŋgam.

History of contact
The first historical notice we have of them appear in an account written by William Ridley, a missionary who undertook a journey among the tribes of southern Queensland in 1855. He stated that the tribe whom he encountered in October of that year at Yandilla, spoke a language called 'Paiamba'.
Ridley's entry is very brief:
Thence I came up the Weir, a tributary of the Macintyre; at four stations thereon, I met with forty blacks; all speak Pikumbul, and know something of Kamilaroi.From the head of the Weir, I again crossed the Downs by Yandilla,where I found nearly a dozen blacks who speak Paiamba, a dialect containing a few words like those of the Brisbane tribes, but which was for the most part quite strange to me.

Alternative names
 Gitabal. (scribal error)
 Gomaingguru. ('Men of the Condamine)
 Paiamba

Source:

Notes

Citations

Sources

Aboriginal peoples of Queensland